Alana Woodward (born 13 July 1990) is an Australian rules footballer who plays for Sydney in the AFL Women's (AFLW). She has previously played for Richmond and St Kilda in the AFL Women's (AFLW).

AFLW career
Woodward signed with Richmond during the 2019 expansion club signing period in September. She made her debut against  at Ikon Park in the opening round of the 2020 season. In June 2021, Woodward was delisted by the club, along with Phoebe Monahan. A week later, she was signed by St Kilda as a delisted free agent. At the end of the season, she was delisted by St Kilda. The following month, she was signed by expansion club Sydney as a delisted free agent.

Statistics
Statistics are correct to the end of the 2020 season.

|- style="background-color: #eaeaea"
! scope="row" style="text-align:center" | 2020
|style="text-align:center;"|
| 13 || 5 || 0 || 0 || 6 || 12 || 18 || 2 || 17 || 0.0 || 0.0 || 1.2 || 2.4 || 3.6 || 0.4 || 3.4
|- 
|- class="sortbottom"
! colspan=3| Career
! 5
! 0
! 0
! 6
! 12
! 18
! 2
! 17
! 0.0
! 0.0
! 1.2
! 2.4
! 3.6
! 0.4
! 3.4
|}

References

External links 

 

1990 births
Living people
Richmond Football Club (AFLW) players
Australian rules footballers from Victoria (Australia)
St Kilda Football Club (AFLW) players
Sydney Swans (AFLW) players